Lawrence (Larry) Speck is the principal of Austin-based architecture and engineering firm, he is also a professor at the University of Texas at Austin, and holds the W. L. Moody Centennial Professorship in Architecture. He is one of the former presidents of the Texas Society of Architecture. He was a dean of the School of Architecture at the University of Texas at Austin from 1992 to 2001 and served as the founding director of the Center of American Architecture and Design from 1982 to 1990.  He attended the Massachusetts Institute of Technology (M.I.T.) as an undergraduate receiving two degrees, one in art and a design from the School of Architecture and one in management from the Sloan School of Management. He has also received his Master of Architecture from M.I.T.

Writings
Speck is the author of over 50 publications focusing primarily on twentieth-century American architecture and urbanism. He has written 2 complete books, "Technology, Sustainability, and Cultural Identity" (2007) and "Landmarks of Texas Architecture" (1986), co-authored another, "The University of Texas at Austin (The Campus Guide)" (2011) and edited and contributed chapters to several others. He also wrote and hosted the PBS documentary, "Building the American City: San Antonio". Speck joined the University of Texas at Austin faculty in 1975 and currently teaches an entry level undergraduate course, "Architecture and Society", a graduate seminar on "Theory and Practice", and Advanced Design. Some teaching awards include: UT Most Interesting Professor Award (2008), Regents’ Outstanding Teaching Award (2009), and Edward J. Dominic Award, given by Texas Society of Architects to outstanding architectural educator (2005). Previously, he taught "Architectural Design Theory" and "Criticism of Architecture" at M.I.T.

Designs
Speck was the lead designer for the Austin Convention Center completed in 1992, the Austin-Bergstrom International Airport completed in 1998 and Rough Creek Lodge completed in 1999 and contributed to the Town Lake Master Plan, which shapes development in downtown Austin. In 1999 Speck joined Page Southerland Page where he is now one of five principals. Page Southerland Page has offices in Houston, Denver, Dallas, Austin and Washington, D.C. Over the last 25 years, his design work has won 42 national design awards, 23 state or regional design awards and 66 local design awards.

He has also served on advisory boards for two U.S. governmental agencies (U. S. State Department Overseas Building Operations and U. S. General Services Administration Design Excellence Program), two national environmental non-profits (Green guard Environmental Institute and Air Quality Sciences) and five schools of architecture (M.I.T., University of Michigan, Tulane University, Louisiana State University, University of Nevada, Las Vegas).

Larry Speck lives and works in Austin, Texas.

List of major works

Campus Services Building, University of Texas, Dallas, Texas
East Avenue Mixed-Use Development, Austin, Texas
U.S. Federal Courthouse, Alpine, Texas
Chickasaw Health Center, Ada, Oklahoma
Discovery Green Park, Houston, Texas
The Grove Restaurant, Houston, Texas
Kaminsky House, Dallas, Texas
AMLI on Second Residential Tower, Austin, Texas
Waterstone Condominiums, Lake Travis, Texas
Herrmann House, Santa Fe, New Mexico
Christ Church Cathedral Expansion, Houston, Texas
Prothro House, Dallas, Texas
FBI Regional Headquarters, Houston, Texas
Seton Medical Center Expansion, Austin, Texas
Austin City Lofts
Wabash Garage, Austin, Texas
Driskill Children's Clinic, McAllen, Texas
Computer Science Corporation Offices, Austin, Texas
Barbara Jordan Terminal, Austin Bergstrom International Airport
Robert E. Johnson State Office Building, Austin, Texas
The Terrace” Office Complex, Austin, Texas
Rough Creek Lodge, Glen Rose, Texas
Intermedics Orthopedics Corporate Headquarters, Austin, Texas
Jones House, Austin, Texas
House for a Single Woman, Austin, Texas
Salado Town Hall, Salado, Texas
Austin Convention Center
Umlauf Sculpture Garden, Austin, Texas
House on Sunny Slope, Austin, Texas
Town Lake Comprehensive Plan, Austin, Texas
Houston Street Transit Project, San Antonio, Texas
Ross House, Lake Travis, Texas
Salado Historic Town Plan
Airy Mount, Burnet, Texas
Tapp Ranch House, Wimberley, Texas
Lemann-Browning House, Austin, Texas
Lakeside House, Austin, Texas
Lehman Library, Lake Travis, Texas
The Tuscany Apartments, Austin, Texas
Town Center (City Hall, Police/Fire Station, Recreation Center), Burnet, Texas
The Bailey Estate (8 houses), Austin, Texas
Matthews Ranch House, Burnet County, Texas
Cable Library, West Lake Hills, Texas
Proposed Housing for the Elderly, Fitchburg, Massachusetts

References

External links 
Larry Speck
University of Texas Experts Guide
School of Architecture Faculty Profile
Architype Review Contributing Editor Profile

American architects
Living people
Year of birth missing (living people)